Klaus-Jürgen Bathe is a civil engineer, professor of mechanical engineering at the Massachusetts Institute of Technology, and founder of ADINA R&D, who specializes in computational mechanics. Bathe is considered to be one of the pioneers in the field of finite element analysis and its applications.

Early life and education
Born in Berlin, Bathe had his high school education in Oldenburg i. O. in the Federal Republic of Germany. He then went to South Africa, where he earned his graduate degree in Civil Engineering and Engineering Mechanics from the University of Cape Town in 1967. Bathe received his M.Sc. degree in Civil Engineering from the University of Calgary, Canada in 1969. Thereafter, he received his Ph.D. in Civil Engineering from the University of California, Berkeley in 1971. His thesis was on numerical solution of large eigenvalue problems, where he developed the subspace iteration method.

Career 
During his time as a post-doctoral fellow (1972–1974) at UC Berkeley, Bathe et al. developed the finite element programs SAP IV and NONSAP, which have been used by thousands of individuals and organizations in research and practice and had a major impact in advancing the finite element method. In 1974 he started the development of the ADINA system. Soon after, he joined the department of mechanical engineering at MIT.

In 1986, he founded ADINA R&D, Inc. On April 7, 2022, Bentley Systems acquired ADINA R&D, Inc.

Major contributions 
Bathe has made fundamental contributions in the finite element analysis of structures, heat transfer, field problems, CFD, and fluid-structure interactions. These contributions are widely used in commercial software codes. Specifically, the following contributions for reliable, accurate and efficient finite element analyses are widely employed:

 Formulation of plate and shell finite elements (the MITC elements).
 Formulations of large deformations of solids (the Total and Updated Lagrangian formulations).
 Solution techniques for large eigenvalue problems (the Bathe subspace iteration method).
 Solution techniques for contact problems (the constraint-function method).
 Time integration schemes for the dynamic analysis of structures and fluid-structure interactions (the Bathe method).
 Schemes for fully coupled fluid-structure interactions and multi-physics problems.
 Mathematical analysis of finite element schemes.
 The book "Finite Element Procedures" used as a standard reference text in academia and industry.

Bathe is widely recognized to bridge the worlds of academia and industry in computational mechanics.

Honors and awards 
Bathe has received many honorary doctorates from institutions around the world: Slovak Academy of Sciences and Technical University of Zilina, Slovakia; Technical University of Darmstadt, Germany; Technical University of Rzeszow, Poland; Universidad Politécnica de Madrid, Spain; University of Bucharest, Romania; University of Miskolc, Hungary; University of Buenos Aires, Argentina; University of Cape Town, South Africa; and Sorbonne Universités – Université de Technologie de Compiègne, France.

Bathe has been listed as an ISI Highly Cited Author in Engineering  by the ISI Web of Knowledge, Thomson Scientific Company.

Editorial activities 
Bathe currently serves as the Co-Editor of the Journal of Computers & Structures. He is also the editor of the Springer's book series on Computational Fluid and Solid Mechanics. He has organized the twelve bi-yearly conferences "Nonlinear Finite Element Analysis and ADINA", at M.I.T., 1977–1999, and the seven bi-yearly conferences "Computational Fluid and Solid Mechanics"  at M.I.T., 2001–2013.

Klaus-Jürgen Bathe Leadership Program 
The Klaus-Jürgen Bathe Leadership Programme was established at the University of Cape Town in 2014 through a gift donated by Professor Klaus-Jürgen Bathe. It is awarded annually to University of Cape Town students with at least 2 years of study left, from any of the six university faculties. The goal of this Program is to produce graduates coming from any faculty of the University of Cape Town, South Africa with outstanding leadership qualities and a strong sense of social justice, who will go on to play leading and significant roles in business, government, industry and civil society in South Africa and on the African continent.

Books 
 K.J. Bathe and E.L. Wilson, "Numerical Methods in Finite Element Analysis", Prentice-Hall, 1976.
 K.J. Bathe, "Finite Element Procedures in Engineering Analysis", Prentice-Hall, 1982.
 K.J. Bathe, "Finite Element Procedures", 1st Edition, Prentice Hall, 1996; 2nd Edition, Watertown, MA: Klaus-Jürgen Bathe, 2014.
 D. Chapelle and K.J. Bathe, "The Finite Element Analysis of Shells – Fundamentals", 1st Edition, Springer, 2003; 2nd edition, Springer, 2011.
 M. Kojic and  K.J. Bathe, "Inelastic Analysis of Solids and Structures", Springer, 2005.
 K.J. Bathe, "To Enrich Life", Amazon.com, 2007, 2nd edition 2019. 
 K.J. Bathe, "How Lawyers Think, Work & when Perhaps not Hire a Lawyer", Amazon.com, 2021.
 M.L. Bucalem, K.J. Bathe, "The Mechanics of Solids and Structures – Hierarchical Modeling and the Finite Element Solution", Springer, 2011.

Video Courses on Finite Element Methods 
 MIT Video Lectures: "Finite Element Procedures for Solids and Structures – Linear Analysis".
 MIT Video Lectures: "Finite Element Procedures for Solids and Structures – Nonlinear Analysis".

References

External links 
  Special issue on K. J. Bathe's 60th birthday anniversary, preface in Computers & Structures
  Founder of ADINA R&D, Inc.

MIT School of Engineering faculty
UC Berkeley College of Engineering alumni
University of Calgary alumni
University of Cape Town alumni
Engineers from Berlin
1943 births
Living people